Birth of a Prince is the third solo studio album by American hip hop musician and Wu-Tang Clan leader RZA. The album was released on October 7, 2003. Unlike RZA's other solo albums, Birth of a Prince was not released under the Bobby Digital alias, though RZA refers to himself as Bobby repeatedly and his rhymes are mostly in the Bobby Digital style rather than the pre-1998 style. The album received mixed reviews from music critics.

Track listing 
Credits adapted from the album's liner notes.

Charts

References

2003 albums
Albums produced by RZA
Albums produced by True Master
RZA albums
Sanctuary Records albums
Albums produced by Bronze Nazareth